Susan Shabangu (28 February 1956) is a South African politician who has been a member of parliament representing the African National Congress since May 1994. She previously held the position of Minister of Social Development. Prior to that, she served as the inaugural Minister of Women in the Presidency, created by President Jacob Zuma in May 2014. She was the Minister of Mineral Resources from 2009 to 2014.

Education 
Susan Shabangu completed her high school career at  Madibane High School in Soweto in 1977.

Career
Before being elected to government, Shabangu was active in the labour movement.  From 1980 to 1985, she was Assistant Secretary for the Federation of South African Women (FEDSAW).  She was also a member of the Federation of Transvaal Women (FEDTRAW). In 1981 she was part of the Anti-Republic Campaign Committee. In 1982, she worked with the Release Mandela Campaign Committee. During 1984-85 she organized the  Amalgamated Black Workers Project. She served on the Industrial Council and was the National Women's Coordinator of the  Transport and General Workers Union (T&GWU). She served on the National Women's Sub-committee of the Congress of South African Trade Unions (COSATU).

Shabangu is a member of the African National Congress (ANC) and the ANC Steering Committee. As an advisor to the September Commission in 1995, she was tasked with surveying the future of unions.in 1996, she became Deputy Minister of Mineral and Energy Affairs of South Africa. In 2004, she became Safety and Security Deputy Minister.

In 2018, she and Minister Bathabile Dlamini exchanged positions, with Dlamini becoming Minister of Women in the Presidency and  Shabangu becoming Minister of Social Development.

Activism
In 2015 she signed an open letter which the ONE Campaign had been collecting signatures for; the letter was addressed to Angela Merkel and Nkosazana Dlamini-Zuma, urging them to focus on women as they serve as the heads of the G7 in Germany and the AU in South Africa respectively, which will start to set the priorities in development funding before a main UN summit in September 2015 that will establish new development goals for the generation.

Controversy
In March 2003 Shabangu was charged with public indecency after an altercation with an airport security official in which she lifted her dress after repeatedly setting off a metal detector.

In April 2008 Shabangu, in her role as deputy minister of safety and security, told an audience of police officers in Pretoria "You must kill the bastards if they threaten you or the community", referring to criminals. The remark was met with widespread controversy.

In August 2012, following an incident at Lonmin Platinum Mine near Rustenburg where 44 people were killed after police opened fire on striking workers belonging to the Association of Mineworkers and Construction Union (AMCU), Shabangu visited the area.  Tasked with investigating what had happened, she reported to Parliament on 21 August 2012 that she had engaged all "affected parties".  When questioned at the Marikana Commission of Inquiry on 26 August 2014 she admitted that these did not include the AMCU or representatives of the striking workers.

References

Living people
Members of the National Assembly of South Africa
Government ministers of South Africa
Place of birth missing (living people)
Women government ministers of South Africa
1956 births
Women members of the National Assembly of South Africa